Jean-Pierre Pichard (17 September 1945 – 13 August 2021) was a French musician and academic. He was known for organizing events promoting the culture of Brittany. He was co-founder of the Festival Interceltique de Lorient.

Biography

Jean-Pierre Pichard died in Lorient on 13 August 2021 at the age of 75.

Awards
Officer of the Ordre des Arts et des Lettres (2016)

References

External Links
 
 

1945 births
2021 deaths
21st-century French musicians
20th-century French musicians
People from Châtellerault
Officiers of the Ordre des Arts et des Lettres